Agaone punctilla is a species of beetle in the family Cerambycidae. It was described by Martins and Santos-Silva in 2010.

References

Rhinotragini
Beetles described in 2010